The Muslim Dhagi are a Muslim community found in the state of Uttar Pradesh in India. They were also known as the Julahas.

Origin
The Muslim Dhagi are converts from the Hindu Dhagi caste. They get their name from the Hindi term dhaga, which means a thread. The Dhagi were traditionally involved in the manufacture of thread. Their area of traditional habitation is the north-western part of the Indo-Gangetic plain. They are an Urdu speaking community, but are also conversant in Hindi. The Dhagi  are entirely Sunni Muslim, and perceive themselves of Shaikh status.

Present circumstances
The community consist of two sub-groups, the Ansari and Bhauhanan. Each of these two sub-divisions are endogamous. They marry close kin, and practice both cross-cousin and parallel cousin marriages.

Their traditional occupation was, and to some extent still is weaving. But like other Muslim artisan communities, they have seen a severe decline in their traditional occupation, as a result of mechanism. Some Dhagi also work as masons and others bring wood from the forest and sell it. A small number have also become petty businessmen. Like other artisan groups, they have a traditional caste council, which acts as an instrument of social control. The caste council deal with issues of intra-community disputes such as elopement and divorces.

See also
Dhagi
Momin Ansari

References

Social groups of Uttar Pradesh
Muslim communities of Uttar Pradesh
Muslim communities of India
Weaving communities of South Asia